The Diet of Worms of 1521 was an imperial diet (a formal deliberative assembly) of the Holy Roman Empire called by Emperor Charles V and conducted in the Imperial Free City of Worms. Martin Luther was summoned to the Diet in order to renounce or reaffirm his views in response to a Papal bull of Pope Leo X. In answer to questioning, he defended these views and refused to recant them. At the end of the Diet, the Emperor issued the Edict of Worms (Wormser Edikt), a decree which condemned Luther as "a notorious heretic" and banned citizens of the Empire from propagating his ideas. Although the Protestant Reformation is usually considered to have begun in 1517, the edict signals the first overt schism.

The diet was conducted from 28 January to 25 May 1521 at the Heylshof Garden, with the Emperor presiding. Other imperial diets took place at Worms in the years 829, 926, 1076, 1122, 1495, and 1545, but unless plainly qualified, the term "Diet of Worms" usually refers to the assembly of 1521.

Background 

In June of the previous year, 1520, Pope Leo X issued the Papal bull Exsurge Domine ("Arise, O Lord"), outlining forty-one purported errors found in Martin Luther's Ninety-five Theses and other writings related to or written by him. Luther was summoned by the emperor. Prince Frederick III, Elector of Saxony obtained an agreement that if Luther appeared he would be promised safe passage to and from the meeting. This guarantee was essential after the treatment of Jan Hus, who was tried and executed at the Council of Constance in 1415 despite a promise of safe conduct.

Emperor Charles V commenced the Imperial Diet of Worms on 23 January 1521. Luther was summoned to renounce or reaffirm his views. When he appeared before the assembly on 16 April, Johann Eck, an assistant of the Archbishop of Trier (Richard von Greiffenklau zu Vollrads at that time), acted as spokesman for the emperor.

Martin Luther

The main events of the Diet of Worms relating to Luther took place from 16 to 18 April 1521.

On 16 April, Luther arrived in Worms. He was told to appear before the Diet at 4 p.m. the following day. Dr. Jeromee Schurff, Wittenberg professor in canon law, was to act as Luther's lawyer before the Diet. The Pope was not at the Diet of Worms.

On 17 April, the imperial marshal, Ulrich von Pappenheim, and the herald, Caspar Sturm, came for Luther. Pappenheim reminded Luther that he should speak only in answer to direct questions from the presiding officer, Johann Eck. Eck asked if a collection of books was Luther's and if he was ready to revoke their heresies. Dr Schurff said: "Please have the titles read". There were 25 of them, probably including The 95 Theses, Resolutions Concerning the 95 Theses, On the Papacy at Rome, Address to the Christian Nobility, The Babylonian Captivity of the Church, and On the Freedom of a Christian. Luther requested more time for a proper answer, so he was given until the next day at 4 p.m.

On 18 April, Luther, saying that he had prayed for long hours and consulted with friends and mediators, presented himself before the Diet. When the counselor put the same questions to him, Luther first apologized that he lacked the etiquette of the court. Then he answered, "They are all mine, but as for the second question, they are not all of one sort." Luther went on to place the writings into three categories: (1) Works which were well received even by his enemies: those he would not reject. (2) Books which attacked the abuses, lies and desolation of the Christian world and the papacy: those, Luther believed, could not safely be rejected without encouraging abuses to continue. To retract them would be to open the door to further oppression. "If I now recant these, then, I would be doing nothing but strengthening tyranny". (3) Attacks on individuals: he apologized for the harsh tone of these writings but did not reject the substance of what he taught in them; if he could be shown by Scripture that his writings were in error, Luther continued, he would reject them.  Luther concluded by saying:

According to tradition, Luther is said to have declared "Here I stand, I cannot do otherwise", before concluding with "God help me. Amen." 

According to Luther, Eck informed Luther that he was acting like a heretic:

Private conferences were held to determine Luther's fate, but he was not arrested at Worms. Through negotiations by his prince, Frederick III, Luther had been given a letter of safe conduct to and from the hearing. After his dismissal he departed for his home in Wittenberg. However, fearing for Luther's safety, Frederick III sent men to fake a highway attack and abduct Luther, hiding him away at Wartburg Castle.

Edict of Worms 

The Edict of Worms was a decree issued on 25 May 1521 by Emperor Charles V.

It was the culmination of an ongoing struggle between Martin Luther and the Catholic Church over reform, especially concerning the practice of donations for indulgences. However, there were other deeper issues that revolved around both theological concerns:
On a theological level, Luther had challenged the absolute authority of the Pope over the Church by maintaining that the doctrine of indulgences, as authorized and taught by the Pope, was wrong. 
Luther maintained that salvation was by faith alone (sola fide) without reference to good works, alms, penance, or the Church's sacraments. Luther maintained that the sacraments were a "means of grace", meaning that while grace was imparted through the sacraments, the credit for the action belonged to God and not to the individual.

Other decisions 
The Diet of Worms was also the occasion for Charles V to reform the administration of the Empire. Given the vast domains of the House of Habsburg, the Emperor was often on the road and needed deputies (such as the Governors of the Netherlands and the Regents of Spain) for the times he was absent from his territories.

Charles V elevated his younger brother Ferdinand to the status of Archduke as Imperial Lieutenant. As such, Ferdinand became regent and governor of the Austrian hereditary lands of Charles V as well as his representative in Germany. Ferdinand's role as chairman of the German Imperial government was never really implemented and ended in 1523 with the dissolution of the body. Ferdinand's rule of the Austrian lands in the name of the Emperor was confirmed with the secret Habsburg compact of Brussels (1522), according to which Charles also agreed to favor the election of Ferdinand as King of the Romans in Germany (which took place in 1531). Following the abdications of Charles V in 1556, Ferdinand succeeded Charles as Emperor and became suo jure Archduke of Austria.

Aftermath 
When Luther eventually emerged from the Wartburg, the emperor, distracted with other matters, did not press for Luther's arrest. Ultimately, because of rising public support for Luther among the German people and the protection of certain German princes, the Edict of Worms was never enforced in Germany. However, in the Low Countries (comprising modern-day Belgium, Luxembourg, and the Netherlands), the Edict was initially enforced against Luther's most active supporters. This could be done because these countries were under the direct rule of Emperor Charles V and his appointed regent, Margaret of Austria, Duchess of Savoy (and Charles's aunt). In December 1521, Jacob Proost, prior of the Augustinian monastery in Antwerp, was the first Luther-supporting cleric to be arrested and prosecuted under the terms of the Worms Edict. In February 1522, Proost was compelled to make public recantation and repudiation of Luther's teachings. Later that year, additional arrests were made among the Augustinians in Antwerp. Two monks, Jan van Essen and Hendrik Vos, refused to recant; on 1 July 1523, they were burned at the stake in Brussels.

The 1522 and 1524 Diets of Nuremberg attempted to execute the judgement of the Edict of Worms against Luther, but they failed.

References

External links 
 
 Luther's Statement at Worms from Bartleby
 "The Diet of Worms" by Charles Beard Chapter IX of Luther and the Reformation in Germany 1896

Martin Luther
16th-century Catholicism
History of Catholicism in Germany
16th-century anti-Protestantism
1520s in the Holy Roman Empire
History of Rhineland-Palatinate
Worms, Germany
Charles V, Holy Roman Emperor
Worms
1521 in the Holy Roman Empire
1521 in politics
1521 in Christianity